Coleocentrus is a genus of parasitoid wasp in the ichneumonid family.

Species 
Selected species:
 Coleocentrus caligatus
 Coleocentrus croceicornis
 Coleocentrus exareolatus
 Coleocentrus excitator
 Coleocentrus flavipes
 Coleocentrus heteropus
 Coleocentrus rufus
 Coleocentrus soldanskii

References

Ichneumonidae
Taxa named by Johann Ludwig Christian Gravenhorst
Insects described in 1829